O'Hair is a surname. Notable people with the surname include:

 Frank T. O'Hair, U.S. Representative from Illinois
 Madalyn Murray O'Hair, American atheist and activist
 Sean O'Hair, American golfer

See also
 O'Hare (disambiguation)
 O'Hare (surname)